Balanta (or Balant) is a group of two closely related Bak languages of West Africa spoken by the Balanta people.

Description
Balanta is now generally divided into two distinct languages: Balanta-Kentohe and Balanta-Ganja.

Balanta-Kentohe
The Balanta-Kentohe (Kəntɔhɛ) language is spoken by about 423,000 people on the north central and central coast of Guinea-Bissau (where as of 2006 it is spoken by about 397,000 people, many of whom can be found in the Oio Region) as well as in the Gambia. Films and portions of the Bible have been produced in Balanta-Kentohe.

The Kəntɔhɛ dialect is spoken in the north, while the Fora dialect is spoken in the south.

Ethnologue lists the alternative names of Balanta-Kentohe as Alante, Balanda, Balant, Balanta, Balante, Ballante, Belante, Brassa, Bulanda, Frase, Fora, Kantohe (Kentohe, Queuthoe), Naga and Mane. The Naga, Mane and Kantohe dialects may be separate languages.

Balanta-Ganja
Balanta-Ganja is spoken by 86,000 people (as of 2006) in the southwest corner of and the south of Senegal. Literacy is less than 1% for Balanta-Ganja. In September 2000, Balanta-Ganja was granted the status of a national language in Senegal, and as of then can now be taught in elementary school.

Ethnologue lists the alternative names of Balanta-Ganja as Alante, Balanda, Balant, Balante, Ballante, Belante, Brassa, Bulanda, Fjaa, Fraase (Fraasɛ). Its dialects are Fganja (Ganja) and Fjaalib (Blip).

Grammar 
Balanta has case prefixes and suffixes alternatively interpreted as a definite article dependent on the noun class.

Phonology
The following are the phonemes of the Balanta dialects.

Consonants 

Voiceless sounds  are only heard in the Guinea Bissau dialect.

Vowels

Writing 
In Senegal, Decree No. 2005-979 provides for an orthography of Balanta as follows:

References

Relevant literature
 Creissels, Denis. 2016. A sketch of Ganja (Balant). In Friederike Lüpke (ed.), The Oxford guide to the Atlantic languages of West Africa. Oxford University Press.
 Mansaly, Jules. 2018. Dictionnaire des proverbes balant: Une langue du groupe atlantique-ouest de la famille niger-congo au Sénégal. (Series: Verbal Art and Documentary Literature in African Languages Volume 37.) Rüdiger Köppe Verlag.
 Migeod, F.W.H.,  The Languages of West Africa Volume II London 1913.
 Westermann, D. & Bryan, M.A. The Languages of West Africa. Published for the International African Institute by Dawsons of Pall Mall, Folkestone & London 1970.

External links
 Video about the Balanta language
 Swadesh List for Balanta-Kentohe
 Decree No. 2005-979 of 21 October 2005 relating to the spelling and the separation of words in Balanta via the website of the Journal officiel 

Languages of Guinea-Bissau
Languages of the Gambia
Languages of Senegal
Bak languages